Surkh-o- Parsa sometimes spelt as Surkhi Parsa is a district in Parwan province, Afghanistan. The center of the district is called Lulinj and is a green valley around a river.

Geography
The district is composed of several separate valleys called Surkh Valley, Parsa Valley, Turkman Valley, Gandaab Valley, Paawaaz Valley as well as Lolenge and Do-aab. In Lolenge, there is historical shrine for pilgrimage known as the “Shah Daleer” or “The Brave King". There is a large historical fort, locally known as “The Castle of Sayid Sarwar Khan". There are two big rivers joining in Lolenge near Tangi Azhdahaar. One of the rivers flows from the Turkman valley of the other one from the Surkh Valley in the center of the district. The river continues its journey through Lolenge, dividing it into two separate parts and joining another river at the end of Lolenge Valley in Do-Aab. This river which flows from Shekh Ali District moving towards Chardeh and Siaah Gerd district.

See also
 Districts of Afghanistan
 Turkman Valley

References

 
Districts of Parwan Province
Hazarajat
Hazara people